"Blackerthreetracker" is a single by alternative rock band Curve, preceding the issue of their second studio album, Cuckoo. It was released on 23 August 1993 and it reached #39 in the UK singles chart. It includes the song "Missing Link", the first track from Cuckoo.

"Blackerthreetracker" was released at the same time with the remix CD, "Blackerthreetrackertwo".

Track listing

Blackerthreetracker
12", CD, MC
"Missing Link" – 4:19
"On the Wheel" – 6:01
"Triumph" – 4:50

Blackerthreetrackertwo
CD
"Missing Link" (Screaming Bird mix) – 6:22
"Rising" (Headspace mix) – 9:21
"Half the Time" (Honey Tongue mix) – 6:18

Music video
A music video was made for "Missing Link" which featured the official and touring members of the band performing this song in a rainy wasteland. The video was shown in the Beavis and Butt-head episode "Water Safety", where the duo comments that the video was "pretty cool".

Credits
 Written by Toni Halliday and Dean Garcia
 "Missing Link" produced by Curve & Flood and mixed by Mark 'Spike' Stent for SSO
 Tracks 2 & 3 produced and mixed by Curve, 
 Sleeve designed by Flat Earth
 Photography by Flat Earth and Vaughan Matthews

References

1993 singles
Curve (band) songs
1993 songs
Song recordings produced by Flood (producer)
Songs written by Dean Garcia
Songs written by Toni Halliday